William Edward Soothill,  (1861 – 1935) was a Methodist missionary to China who later became Professor of Chinese at University College, Oxford, and a leading British sinologist.

Life
Born in Halifax, Yorkshire in January 1861, Soothill matriculated at London University. He entered the ministry of the United Methodist Free Church arriving in China in 1882 and spent 29 years as a missionary in Wenzhou, China. Another leading missionary there until 1909 was Grace Stott who led the China Inland Mission there.

Soothill founded a hospital, a training college, schools and 200 preaching stations. In 1911 Soothill became President of the Imperial University at Shansi. Upon his return to England in 1920 he was appointed the Shaw Professor of Chinese at Oxford University, becoming a Fellow of University College, Oxford.

In 1921, he was awarded the Order of Wen-Hu (third class) by the  Republic of China in recognition of services rendered in connection with the Chinese Labour Corps in France. In 1926 he was a member of Lord Willingdon's delegation to China on the settlement of the Boxer Rebellion indemnities.

He is best known for his translation into English of the Analects of Confucius and his Dictionary of Chinese Buddhist Terms with Sanskrit and English Equivalents and a Sanskrit-Pali Index. He married Lucy Farrar in 1884. She wrote an account of their years in China entitled A Passport to China.

He and his wife Lucy were the parents of Dorothea, Lady Hosie, whose husband was the diplomat Sir Alexander Hosie. Lady Hosie was the author of a number of books about China.

Selected works 
 
 
 
 The Student's Four Thousand and General Pocket Dictionary (1899)
 A Mission in China (1906,1907)
 The Analects of Confucius (1910)
 China and Education, with Special Reference to the University for China (1912)
 The Three Religions of China (1913; revised edition 1929)
 Timothy Richard of China (1924)
 China and the West: A sketch of their Intercourse (1925)
 A History of China (1927)
 China and England (1928)
 The Lotus of the Wonderful Law: or, The Lotus Gospel (1930)
 A Dictionary of Chinese Buddhist Terms: with Sanskrit and English Equivalents and a Sanskrit-Pali Index (1937, with Lewis Hodous)
 The Hall of Light: A study of Early Chinese Kingship, edited by Lady Hosie and G. F. Hudson (1951)

Sources 
The Methodist Archives Biographical Index: Minutes of Conference 1958 and Encyclopedia of World Methodism (1974)

Notes

References and further reading

External links
  "William E. Soothill," Biographical Dictionary of Chinese Christianity

1861 births
1935 deaths
British sinologists
English lexicographers
Chinese–English translators
People from Halifax, West Yorkshire
English Methodist missionaries
Methodist missionaries in China
British people of the Boxer Rebellion
Shaw Professors of Chinese
Missionary linguists